Väino Aren (born on 11 August 1933 Pala, Tartu County) is an Estonian ballet dancer, actor and operetta singer.

Career
He studied at Vanemuine Ballet Studio in Tartu. From 1953 until 1955, he studied at the Leningrad Choreographic School. In 1959 he graduated from Tallinn Choreographic School.

From 1950 until 1971 (with pauses), he was ballet soloist at Estonia Theatre; from 1971 until 1975 operetta soloist and since 1978 a stage manager at Estonia Theatre. He has also played in films and television series, such as his longstanding role as Kristjan Rosenkampf-Jägerfreund in the Eesti Televisioon drama series Õnne 13 since 1993.

Personal life
Väino Aren's father was a railway worker and his mother a kindergarten teacher. His older brother was actor Rein Aren.

Aren was married to ballerina and frequent stage partner Helju Aren. They were married until her death in 1984. Aren is the partner of opera singer Anu Kaal since 1986.

References

Living people
1933 births
Estonian male ballet dancers
Estonian male stage actors
Estonian male television actors
Estonian male film actors
Estonian male musical theatre actors
20th-century Estonian male actors
20th-century Estonian male  singers
Recipients of the  Order of the White Star, 5th Class
People from Peipsiääre Parish